Alcée Fortier High School was a high school in Uptown New Orleans, Louisiana that served grades 8-12. It was located five blocks away from McMain Secondary School.

History
The school opened in 1931 and was named for the renowned professor of Romance Languages at Tulane, Alcee Fortier. Originally Fortier was an all-boys school.

In 1992 Michael Lach and Michael Loverude of The Christian Science Monitor stated "Based on test scores, dropout rates, and socioeconomic status of the students, the schools we taught in were two of the worst high schools in the country - Booker T. Washington and Alcee Fortier high schools. Given these circumstances, both schools do a fine job, but students leave deserving so much more." In 2006 John Schmid of the Milwaukee Journal Sentinel said that Fortier was considered to be one of the "worst" schools in Louisiana. Around 2003 it made an "academically unacceptable" list. The school closed in 2006.

Lusher Charter School's secondary campus opened in the former Fortier building.

Curriculum
The school offered German after its 1931 opening. About 150 students per academic period studied German. German was discontinued in the New Orleans school system in 1938 as World War II broke out.

Athletics

Championships
Football championships
(1) State Championship: 1948

Notable alumni
 Ashley Ambrose - NFL Cornerback from 1992 to 2004, played for several teams including the Atlanta Falcons (2002-2003) New Orleans Saints (1999) and (2003-2004)
 Edward S. Bopp (Class of 1949), New Orleans lawyer and former state representative 
 Edmund Graves Brown, newspaper executive
 Victor Gold (Class of 1945)
 Al Hirt - Musician
 Russell Long - U.S. senator from 1948 to 1987
 Jason Mitchell - American actor best known for portraying rapper Eazy-E in the 2015 biopic Straight Outta Compton.
 Howard K. Smith - television journalist
 Matthew Teague - American football player
 Norman Treigle - operatic bass-baritone
 John Kennedy Toole - novelist
 Dave Treen (Class of 1945) - governor of Louisiana from 1980 to 1984
 Tony Washington (American football player) - Played American football in his junior year, moved to University School of Las Colinas because of Hurricane Katrina
 Aeneas Williams - member of the Pro Football Hall of Fame

Notes
 Merrill, Ellen C. Germans Of Louisiana. Pelican Publishing, 2005. , 9781455604845.

References

Defunct public high schools in New Orleans
Defunct middle schools in New Orleans
 
1931 establishments in Louisiana
Educational institutions established in 1931
2008 disestablishments in Louisiana